William, Willie, Bill or Billy McColl or MacColl may refer to:

 Bill McColl (born 1930), American football player and politician
 Billy McColl, 1970s footballer (Clydebank F.C.)
 Billy McColl (actor) (1951–2014), Scottish actor
 William McColl (clarinetist), American clarinetist
 William McColl (footballer) (1865–1903), Scottish 1890s footballer